Queensy Menig (born 19 August 1995) is a Dutch professional footballer who plays as a winger for Partizan.

Club career

Ajax
On 6 June 2012, Menig signed a three-year contract with Ajax, tying him down to the club until 30 June 2015. On 11 August 2014, he marked his debut for the reserves team Jong Ajax with two goals in an Eerste Divisie match against Telstar. He made his first team debut in the KNVB Cup in the first official Amsterdam derby to be contested since 1983, scoring on his debut against JOS Watergraafsmeer in the Olympic Stadium. The match ended in a 9–0 victory for Ajax, with Menig scoring in the 70th minute of the match. In October 2014, Menig extended his contract with Ajax until 2019. He made his league debut for the clubs' first team on 6 December 2014, coming on as a 76th-minute substitute in the 5–0 win at home against Willem II.

Nantes
On 31 August 2017, it was announced that Menig had transferred to the French Ligue 1 side FC Nantes, who in turn immediately loaned him out to EFL League One Oldham Athletic on a season long loan spell.

Menig was loaned out once again, this time to his former club PEC Zwolle, for the rest of the season.

Twente
On 9 September 2019, he returned to the Netherlands, signing a two-year contract with one-year extension option with Twente. On 12 September, he made his debut for the club in a home match against Fortuna Sittard, scoring the 1–0 goal after an assist from Jayden Oosterwolde, as Twente won 2–0. On 5 December 2020 he scored both goals in an impressive 1-2 win away against his former club Ajax.

Partizan
On 2 September 2021 Queensy Menig signed a three-year deal with Partizan. The former Ajax academy graduate signed to Partizan from Twente for a fee around €700k. Menig scored his first goal for Partizan in his full debut against Anorthosis Famagusta, in Round 1 of UEFA Europa Conference League Menig was voted Player of the Week 11 in Serbian SuperLiga after recording two assists and a goal in a 5–0 victory against Spartak Subotica. He scored a winning goal on Letná Stadium in 0–1 away victory over Sparta Prague in Knockout round play-offs of Europa Conference League.

Personal life
Born in the Netherlands, Menig is of Surinamese descent.

Career statistics

Honours

Netherlands U-17
 UEFA European Under-17 Football Championship: 2012

Individual
 Best player of AEGON Future Cup: 2012

References

External links
 Netherlands profile

1995 births
Living people
Association football wingers
Association football forwards
Footballers from Amsterdam
Dutch footballers
Netherlands under-21 international footballers
Netherlands youth international footballers
Dutch expatriate footballers
Dutch sportspeople of Surinamese descent
Eredivisie players
Eerste Divisie players
English Football League players
AFC Ajax players
Jong Ajax players
PEC Zwolle players
FC Nantes players
Oldham Athletic A.F.C. players
FC Twente players
FK Partizan players
Expatriate footballers in France
Expatriate footballers in England